Embidopsocus laticeps is a species of booklouse in the family Liposcelididae. It is found in the Caribbean Sea, Central America, and North America.

References

Liposcelididae
Articles created by Qbugbot
Insects described in 1963
Insects of the Caribbean